Shea Theodore (born August 3, 1995) is a Canadian professional ice hockey defenceman for the  Vegas Golden Knights of the National Hockey League (NHL). Theodore was selected by the Anaheim Ducks in the first round, 26th overall, of the 2013 NHL Entry Draft.

Theodore began his minor hockey career with the Aldergrove Minor Hockey Association, during which he established himself as the most outstanding player in the team's franchise history. His successful minor career earned him a selection in the 2010 WHL Bantam Draft, by the Seattle Thunderbirds. During his tenure with the team, Theodore served as captain and competed for Team Canada at various international tournaments. He won a gold medal at the 2013 IIHF World U18 Championships and 2015 World Junior Ice Hockey Championships and a silver medal at the 2019 IIHF World Championship.

Playing career

Youth
Theodore began his hockey career in Fraser Valley, opting out of the Burnaby Winter Club. He played minor hockey with the Aldergrove Minor Hockey Association during the 2009–10 season prior to his Bantam draft eligibility. On April 29, 2010, Theodore was drafted in the third round of the 2010 WHL Bantam Draft, by the Seattle Thunderbirds in the Western Hockey League (WHL). At the time of his selection, he was measured at 5’10 and 142-pounds. By the time he graduated from minor hockey, Theodore established himself as the most outstanding player in the team's franchise history. Theodore and his family gave credit for his impact to coaches Steve Howerton, Dan Armstrong, Kris Armstrong, Steve Potomak, and Tim Preston, Theodore's trainer for 10 years. He played four games with the Thunderbirds but spent the majority of the 2010–11 season with the Fraser Valley Bruins in the British Columbia midget major league. He was also selected to compete with Team BC at the 2011 Canada Winter Games.

Prior to the 2011–12 season, Theodore partook in the Seattle Thunderbirds rookie camp. After making the final roster, Theodore recorded 35 points in 69 games during his first full season. He recorded his first career major junior goal in a 6–3 win over the Portland Winterhawks on November 19, 2011. As the 2013 NHL Entry Draft approached, Theodore was rated as a top prospect by various scouts. Midway through the 2012–13 season, Theodore was ranked 17th amongst American skaters by the NHL Central Scouting Bureau and was eventually drafted in the first round of the 2013 NHL Entry Draft by the Anaheim Ducks. He signed a three-year, entry-level contract with the team on September 24, 2013. Theodore continued his high scoring pace during the 2013–14 WHL season, where he led all WHL defensemen in scoring and was selected for the Western Conference 1st Team All-Star team. He was assigned to the Ducks American Hockey League (AHL) affiliate, the Norfolk Admirals, on April 10, 2014 but recorded no points in four games.

After attending the Ducks training camp, Theodore was reassigned to the WHL for the 2014–15 season. Following a mid-season injury to captain Justin Hickman, Theodore was selected to wear the "C" for the remainder of the year. In his final season of junior hockey, Theodore served an assistant captain and was awarded the Bill Hunter Memorial Trophy as WHL Defenseman of the Year. He joined the Ducks AHL affiliate, the Norfolk Admirals, in April 2015 after recording 13 goals and 35 assists in 43 games.

Professional
Theodore was assigned to the San Diego Gulls, the Ducks inaugural AHL affiliate, to begin the 2015–16 season. He earned his first NHL call up on October 17 but was returned to the AHL without making his debut. Theodore eventually made his NHL debut on December 30, 2015, against the Calgary Flames. In the 1–0 victory which ended the Flames' home win streak, he played on a pairing with Clayton Stoner. He would later record his first career NHL goal in a game against the Ottawa Senators on January 13, 2016, and help the Ducks qualify for the 2016 Stanley Cup playoffs. During their first-round matchup against Nashville, Theodore's time on ice slowly lowered due to errors as the team eventually lost in the first round.

The following season, Theodore was once again assigned to the San Diego Gulls after participating in the Ducks training camp. He spent the remainder of the season moving between the Ducks and Gulls, an amount he estimated surpassed 15 times. He again played in the 2017 Stanley Cup playoffs, where he recorded his first postseason goal on April 17, 2017. However, his tenure with the Ducks was shortly coming to a close. On June 21, 2017, at the NHL Expansion Draft, Theodore was traded by the Ducks to the Vegas Golden Knights in order for the Ducks to keep established defenceman Josh Manson and ensure the Golden Knights selected Clayton Stoner.

Upon arriving, he was assigned to the Golden Knights AHL affiliate, the Chicago Wolves, to begin the 2017–18 season, but was recalled to the NHL on October 30. As he was the only waiver exempt player on the Golden Knights roster, he was consistently shuffled in between the AHL and NHL rosters. During his time with the Golden Knights in the 2018 Stanley Cup playoffs, Theodore averaged 21:37 minutes and was praised for his skating ability by teammates. Prior to the 2018–19 season, Theodore signed a seven-year, $36.4 million contract extension with the Golden Knights on September 24, 2018. At the time of the signing, he had missed nearly two weeks of training camp due to the contract dispute. One of the key features of the dispute was the length of the contract, as the team wished for a longer-term than a two-year deal. In spite of this, he recorded a career high 37 points in 79 games as the Golden Knights again qualified for the Stanley Cup playoffs. Following their elimination, Theodore trained in Vancouver with Morgan Rielly and Devon Toews.

Prior to the 2019–20 season, Theodore underwent surgery to treat his testicular cancer. Theodore's grandmother, who was also being treated for cancer, was invited to drop the ceremonial first puck during the Golden Knights Hockey Fights Cancer game on November 21, 2019.

International play

During the 2012–13 season, Theodore was a member of Team Canada under-18 squad when it won gold medals at both the 2012 Ivan Hlinka Memorial Tournament and the 2013 IIHF World U18 Championships. Theodore would again play for the Team Canada during the 2015 World Junior Ice Hockey Championship, where he helped them hold the Russians scoreless in the third period to win the gold medal.

On April 29, 2019, Theodore was slated to make his full international debut after he was named to the Team Canada roster for the 2019 IIHF World Championship, held in Slovakia. While undergoing preparations to compete in the tournament, he was diagnosed with testicular cancer after failing a drug test due to high hCG hormone levels. In spite of this, he helped Canada progress through to the playoff rounds before losing the final to Finland to finish with the silver medal. Theodore completed the tournament posting 2 goals and 7 points in 10 games from the blueline.

Personal life
Theodore was born on August 3, 1995, to millwright Cam and bankworker Corrine Theodore. His older sister Alyssa also plays ice hockey in women's and men's leagues while attending the University of the Fraser Valley for her Bachelor of Arts degree.

Career statistics

Regular season and playoffs

International

Awards and honours

References

External links
 

1995 births
Living people
Anaheim Ducks draft picks
Anaheim Ducks players
Canadian ice hockey defencemen
Chicago Wolves players
Ice hockey people from British Columbia
National Hockey League first-round draft picks
Norfolk Admirals players
People from Langley, British Columbia (city)
San Diego Gulls (AHL) players
Seattle Thunderbirds players
Vegas Golden Knights players
University of the Fraser Valley alumni